Take This Waltz may refer to:

 "Take This Waltz" (song), song by Leonard Cohen
 Take This Waltz (film), a 2011 film